The Nepal Independent Hotel Workers Union (NIHWU) is a Nepalese trade union formed in 1981. The union existed as a separate entity until 1989 when it helped form the General Federation of Nepalese Trade Unions.

References

Trade unions in Nepal

Trade unions established in 1981
1989 establishments in Nepal